Sturdivant can refer to:

 Sturdivant (surname)
 Sturdivant, Missouri
 The Sturdivant Gang, a group of counterfeiters